Betalipothrixvirus is a genus of viruses in the family Lipothrixviridae. Archaea serve as natural hosts. The genus contains six species.

Taxonomy
The following six species are assigned to the genus:
 Acidianus filamentous virus 3
 Acidianus filamentous virus 6
 Acidianus filamentous virus 7
 Acidianus filamentous virus 8
 Acidianus filamentous virus 9
 Sulfolobus islandicus filamentous virus

Structure
Viruses in Betalipothrixvirus are enveloped, with rod-shaped geometries. The diameter is around 24 nm, with a length of 2000 nm. Genomes are linear, around 40.5kb in length. The genome has 67 open reading frames.

Life cycle
Viral replication is cytoplasmic. Entry into the host cell is achieved by adsorption into the host cell. DNA templated transcription is the method of transcription. Archaea serve as the natural host. Transmission routes are passive diffusion.

References

External links
 Viralzone: Betalipothrixvirus
 ICTV

Virus genera
Lipothrixviridae